Altaf Hussain Tafu Khan (born 1945), better known as Ustad Tafu or simply Tafoo, is a Pakistani musician from Lahore, Pakistan known as a 'master tabla player'.  Ustad Tafu is especially adept at playing the musical instrument Tabla . Ustad Tafu has also been associated with Coke Studio in Pakistan. 

He is the father of musicians Tariq Tafu, Tanveer Tafu, and Sajjad Tafu.

Early life and career 
Ustad Tafu was born in Lahore, Pakistan to a musician's family, "a part of a musical legacy that spans seven generations." Tafu started his career in 1970 when his first film song,  as music director, sung by Noor Jehan was featured in movie Anwara (1970). Ahead in the following year 1971, one of his hit chartbusters-- Mahi Keh Gaya Milan Ga Main Fer Aa Ke Te Dass Ke Tareekh Na Gaya, released in movie Sajawal. Another film song was in film Sohra Te Jawai (1980), sung by Noor Jehan, lyrics by Khawaja Pervez "Rab jane sahnoon te tu maar suttia". Ustad Tafu has composed music for over 100 films and has worked with music artists such as Noor Jehan, Shaukat Ali, Inayat Hussain Bhatti, Naheed Akhtar and Nusrat Fateh Ali Khan.

Ustad Tafu showcased his tabla playing skills at the Coke Studio Pakistan (season 7) along with musicians Bilal Maqsood and the Pakistani pop rock music group Strings (band).

In 2017, Ustad Tafu claimed in an interview that he first introduced Naseebo Lal as a playback singer in the Pakistani film industry. He also comes from an extended family of film score composers – Master Inayat Hussain being his maternal cousin. 

In 2018, Ustad Tafu also appeared on Adil Omar's album Transcendence as an arranger, percussionist and playing harmonium for "We Need to Talk About Adil."

Some of his films as a musician
 Sajawal (1971)
Ik Madari (1973)
 Wehshi Gujjar (1979)
 Dubai Chalo (1979)
 Sohra Te Jawai (1980)
 Charda Suraj (1982)
 Des Pardes (1983)
 Madam Rani (1995)

Some of Ustad Tafu's popular songs

Awards and recognition
Nigar Award for Best Music in film Dubai Chalo'' (1979)
 Pride of Performance Award (2023)

References

External links
 

Tabla players
Pakistani percussionists
Pakistani musicians
Living people
1945 births
Pakistani composers
Pakistani film score composers
Nigar Award winners
Coke Studio (Pakistani TV program)